John Flint may refer to:
 John Flint (footballer) (1919–2007), Australian rules footballer
 John Flint (businessman) (born 1968), British banking businessman
 John Flint Cahan (1889–1928), Canadian politician
 John Flint Kidder (1830–1901), American politician
 John Flint South (1797–1882), English surgeon
 John E. Flint, Canadian historian

See also
 Jonathan Flint (disambiguation)
 John Flynt
 Brianna Wu, who was born John Walker Flynt